The Roman Catholic Diocese of Bondoukou is a diocese located in the city of Bondoukou in the Ecclesiastical province of Bouaké in Côte d'Ivoire. It was established on July 3, 1987. Its cathedral is the Cathédrale Saints Odile in Bondoukou. The first two Bishops of Bondoukou (Roman rite) were Alexandre Kouassi (August 28, 1987 – December 12, 1994) and Félix Kouadjo (April 22, 1996 – May 6, 2012).  The current bishop was appointed on June 28, 2019.

Bishops

Ordinaries
Alexandre Kouassi (1987-1994)
Félix Kouadjo (1996-2012)
Bruno Essoh Yedoh (2019- )

Other priest of this diocese who became bishop
Paulin Kouabénan N`Gnamé, appointed Bishop of San Pedro-en-Côte d'Ivoire in 2007

See also
Roman Catholicism in Côte d'Ivoire
 List of Roman Catholic dioceses in Côte d'Ivoire

Sources
 GCatholic.org
 Catholic Hierarchy

Roman Catholic dioceses in Ivory Coast
Christian organizations established in 1987
Roman Catholic dioceses and prelatures established in the 20th century
Gontougo
1987 establishments in Ivory Coast
Roman Catholic Ecclesiastical Province of Bouaké